= Raymond Herzog =

American businessman

Raymond Herzog was an American businessman who was a chairman of the Minnesota Mining and Manufacturing Company.

== Biography ==
Born in Merricourt, North Dakota, Herzog spent his early life in Appleton, Wisconsin. He studied at Lawrence University and received a bachelor's degree in physics. After his graduation, he became a high school teacher.

In 1970, he was named as the chief executive officer (CEO) and chairman of 3M. From 1970 to 1975, he was the president of 3M.

In 1997, he died due to cancer.
